Raybestos is a brand of automotive brakes established in 1902 by Arthur H. Raymond and Arthur F. Law of Bridgeport, Connecticut.

History

In 1906, Raymond and Law invented the woven brake lining, an important innovation in automotive brakes.

From 1919 to 1989 Raybestos brand was manufactured by Raymark Industries, Inc, of Stratford, Connecticut.

Raymark Industries filed for Chapter 11 bankruptcy in 1998.

The Brand is currently distributed by Brake Parts Inc based in McHenry, Illinois. In August 2020, First Brands Group (Trico) acquired Brake Parts Inc.

Superfund site cleanup
The Stratford, Connecticut factory site is a designated Superfund site. The Federal Environmental Protection Agency reported:

See also
 Connecticut Brakettes — women's fastpitch softball team founded in 1947 at Raybestos.

References

Auto parts suppliers of the United States
Brakes
Manufacturing companies based in Illinois
Companies based in McHenry County, Illinois
Manufacturing companies established in 1902
1902 establishments in Connecticut
Companies that filed for Chapter 11 bankruptcy in 1998
Stratford, Connecticut
Superfund sites in Connecticut